Mersin İdmanyurdu (also Mersin İdman Yurdu, Mersin İY, or MİY) Sports Club; located in Mersin, east Mediterranean coast of Turkey in 2008–09. The team participated in TFF Second League for 4th time in the league's 7th season. Mersin İdmanyurdu has finished 2007–08 TFF Second League Promotion Group at 2nd place and directly promoted to 2009–10 TFF First League season.

Hüseyin Çalışkan was club president at the start of the season. On 24 September 2008, Ali Kahramanlı was elected president. Ercan Albay managed the team during the season. Erdal Sezek and Sami İzcican were most appeared (36) players, while Zafer Biryol was the top goalscorer with 16 goals.

2008–09 TFF Second League participation
Mersin idmanyurdu participated in 2008–09 TFF Second League (the league has been played under the name of "Second League Category B" between 2001–02 and 2005–06; "TFF League B" in 2006–07; and "TFF Second League" since 2007–08. Also sponsor names have been included in various seasons.). League was played by 54 teams in three stages. League was started on 31 August 2008. In the first stage teams fought in regionally specified five ranking groups (10 teams in Group 5, 11 teams in 1,2,3, and 4th Groups) for top two rankings to be qualified for Promotion Group in the next stage. In the second stage 10 teams fought for promotion to 2009–10 TFF First League. Champions and runners-up directly were promoted. Remaining (8 in Group 5; 9 in other groups) teams played in Classification Groups. Classification group winners were qualified to promotion play-offs, while bottom two teams relegated to 2009–10 TFF Third League. In the third stage, the third team to be promoted was determined in promotion-play-offs played in one-leg elimination system in a neutral venue. Play-offs were played by 8 teams (three from promotion group, 5 from each classification groups) in Ankara Cebeci İnönü Stadium between 26–31 May 2009.

Mersin İdmanyurdu took place in 2008–09 TFF Second League Ranking Group 3 in the first stage and finished 2nd. In Promotion Group, team finished at 2nd again and gained direct promotion to 2009–10 TFF First League.

Results summary
Mersin İdmanyurdu (MİY) 2008–09 TFF Second League season league summary:

Sources: 2008–09 TFF Second League pages.

Ranking group league table
Mersin İY's league performance in 2008–09 TFF Second League Ranking Group 3 is shown in the following table.

Three points for a win. Rules for classification: 1) points; 2) tie-break; 3) goal difference; 4) number of goals scored. In the score columns first scores belong to MİY.
 (Q): Qualified to 2008–09 Second League Promotion Group.Source: 2008–09 TFF Second League pages from TFF website, Turkish-Soccer website, and Maçkolik website.

Ranking group games
Mersin İdmanyurdu (MİY) 2008–09 TFF Second League season first half game reports in Ranking Group 2 is shown in the following table.
Kick off times are in EET and EEST.

Sources: 2008–09 TFF Second League pages.

Promotion group league table
Mersin İY's league performance in 2008–09 TFF Second League Promotion Group season is shown in the following table.

Three points for a win. Rules for classification: 1) points; 2) tie-break; 3) goal difference; 4) number of goals scored. In the score columns first scores belong to MİY.(C): Champions;  (P): Promoted to 2009–10 TFF First League;  (Q): Qualified to 2008–09 Promotion Play-offs.Source: 2008–09 TFF Second League pages from TFF website, Turkish-Soccer website, and Maçkolik website.

Promotion group games
Mersin İdmanyurdu (MİY) 2008–09 TFF Second League season first half game reports in Promotion Group is shown in the following table.
Kick off times are in EET and EEST.

Sources: 2008–09 TFF Second League pages.

2008–09 Turkish Cup participation
MİY did not participate in 2008–09 Turkish Cup due to eligibility rules. 47th Turkish Cup (played as Fortis Türkiye Kupası for sponsorship purposes) was played by 54 teams in three stages. Top four teams in previous year's TFF Second League groups were eligible to play. MİY had finished 2007–08 season in 6th place was not eligible to play in the Cup. In the first stage two qualification rounds were played in one-leg elimination system. In the second stage (group stage) 20 teams played in four groups, 5 teams in each, in a one-leg round-robin system. Top two teams in each group played in knock-out stage. Beşiktaş won the cup for the 8th time.

Management

Club management
Hüseyin Çalışkan was club president at the start of the season. Ali Kahramanlı, a businessman, was elected president in the club congress held on 24 September 2008 after fourth round in the first stage.

Coaching team
Ercan Albay managed the team during the season. He was commonly mentioned with Adana sides who were main rivals of the fans, so he met with reaction, but he come down to the history of the club by the promotion to upper league in this season.

2008–09 Mersin İdmanyurdu head coaches

Note: Only official games were included.

2008–09 squad
Appearances, goals and cards count for 2008–09 TFF Second League Ranking and Promotion Group games. This season optional kit numbers selected by players were allowed for the first time in the league's history. 18 players appeared in each game roster, three to be replaced. Only the players who appeared in game rosters were included and listed in order of appearance.

Sources: TFF club page and maçkolik team page.

U-18 team
TFF organized Deplasmanlı Süper Gençler Ligi (DSGL) (Round-robin Super Youth League) in 2008–09. League was formed by 10 regional groups. Mersin İdmanyurdu U-18 team took place in Adana Group with 12 other teams from clubs that participated that year in professional leagues. MİY youth team finished 2nd after Adana Demirspor.

Being runners-up of Adana Group, MİY U-18 team promoted to national group stage, where three teams played elimination games. MİY eliminated Şanlıurfaspor 1-0 (a.e.t) and Tokatspor 7-6 (1-1 and 6-5 pen.) in Group B. The group B games were played in Kahramanmaraş. In quarter-finals MİY U-18 team lost to Gaziantepspor 1-2 in İstanbul and was eliminated. Later Gaziantepspor was eliminated at semi-finals.

See also
 Football in Turkey
 2008–09 TFF Second League
 2008–09 Turkish Cup

Notes and references

2008-09
Turkish football clubs 2008–09 season